Yölintu (Finnish for "night bird") is a Finnish schlager band from Pori. The band was formed by Simo Silmu and Markus Kuusijoensuu in 1992.

The band has sold over 338,579 records, which makes it one of the best-selling music artists in Finland.

Band members 
Current members
 Simo Silmu – vocals, accordion (1992–present)
 Matti Silmu – guitar
 Joni Leino – drums
 Jari Luostari – bass guitar
 Jukka Harju – guitar

Former members (incomplete)
 Markus Kuusijoensuu – lead guitar
 Mikko Taipale - drums

Discography

Albums 
 Yölintu laskeutuu (1993)
 Pieni lintunen (1994)
 Kaikki kohdallaan (1997)
 Tositarkoituksella (1998)
 Pienen pojan haaveet (2000)
 Sitä saa mitä tilaa (2001)
 Tää on rankkaa (2002)
 Mennyttä miestä (2005)
 Haavoittumaton (2007)
 Nyt ja aina (2009)
 Iso lemmen pala – Baddingin jalanjäljissä... (2011)
 Minne maailma kuljettaa (2012)
 Maailma on kauneimillaan (2018)

Compilation albums 
 Mahdunko maailmaas – kaikki parhaat (2003)
 Tanssin taikaa – 16 hittiä (2006)
 Hetkiin menneisiin – suurimmat laulut (2009)
 20 suosikkia – Mä putoan (2013)

References

External links 
 

Finnish schlager groups
Musical groups established in 1992